The Pink Line is a line common to a number of rail systems. See:
Pink Line (Bangkok), metro rail line under construction in Bangkok
Pink Line (CTA), rapid transit line in Chicago
Pink Line (Delhi Metro), a metro rail line of the Delhi Metro
Pink Line (Jaipur Metro), rapid transit system in the city of Jaipur, India
Pink Line (Montreal Metro) (proposed new line), a new subway line proposal for the Montreal Metro in Canada
Viva Pink, a Viva bus rapid transit line in Ontario, Canada
K Line (Los Angeles Metro), an under construction light rail line in Los Angeles, California
Hammersmith & City line, of the London Underground
Barcelona Metro line 8, part of the Barcelona Metro network
Line 8 (Madrid Metro), of the Madrid Metro
Seoul Subway Line 8, serves the southeastern parts of Seoul and Seongnam
Line 13, Shanghai Metro
MTR Disneyland Resort Line, Hong Kong
Sennichimae Line (Osaka), Japan
Tanjung Priok Line of KRL Commuterline in Jakarta, Indonesia
Toei Asakusa Line, Tokyo, Japan
RER E, Paris, France

See also 
Red Line (disambiguation)
Magenta Line (disambiguation)
Purple Line (disambiguation)